or JRN is a commercial radio network in Japan, established on May 2, 1965. The network is run by TBS Radio & Communications, Inc. (TBS Radio).

Japan Radio Network stations

External links
http://www.tbs.co.jp/radio/jrn/

Radio in Japan
Japanese radio networks
Radio stations established in 1965